Elmer Bäck (born 18 October 1981) is a Finnish actor who is best known for starring in a 2015 Peter Greenaway film Eisenstein in Guanajuato. He has been in theatrical productions, in movies and on television in Finland, and is part of the theatre group Nya Rampen, based in Berlin, Germany.

Personal life
Bäck is a Swedish-speaking Finn. He married Brenda, a Mexican costume designer, in 2017. They had met during the production of Eisenstein in Guanajuato.

Selected filmography

Missä kuljimme kerran (2011)
Eisenstein in Guanajuato (2015)
The Last Ones (2020)

References

External links

Finnish male film actors
1981 births
Living people
Swedish-speaking Finns